In medieval France a chasse-marée was a cart designed to carry fresh fish to inland markets, with a minimum of weight put into construction and provision for harnessing four horses.

The medieval French chasse-marée merchants originally catered to the demand for fresh fish in inland markets by carrying fish in pairs of baskets on pack ponies, as far as possible, overnight. However, the distance coverable before the fish deteriorated was limited.

Later, where the quality of the road permitted, the range might be extended by the use of charrettes (carts). When designed for this trade, with a minimum of weight put into their construction and provision for harnessing the four horses, these vehicles took the name of chasse-marée. As speed was essential, they were normally hauled by two pairs of horses rather than the single horse which is normal for a cart. The vehicle took the form of two wheels, of a diameter large enough to minimize the slowing effect of bumps in the road. On their axle was mounted an open rectangular frame within which were slung the baskets holding the fish, packed in seaweed. More baskets were stacked above. The teams of usually fairly small horses were worked hard and changed at posting stations in the same way as those of mail coaches.

The coast supplying Paris by road was originally, that which was nearest to its market, around Le Tréport and Saint-Valery-sur-Somme. At its most developed, it extended from Fécamp to Calais including such places as Dieppe, Boulogne-sur-Mer and Étaples.

Some horse lovers have been attracted to the idea of driving a version of the chasse-marée carts, as a recreation.

References

Carts
Medieval France
History of transport in France